Red Funnel, the trading name of the Southampton Isle of Wight and South of England Royal Mail Steam Packet Company Limited, is a ferry company that carries passengers, vehicles and freight on routes between the English mainland and the Isle of Wight. High-speed foot passenger catamarans, known as Red Jets, run between Southampton and Cowes, while vehicle ferries run between Southampton and East Cowes.

Red Funnel's main competitor is Wightlink whose services operate from Portsmouth to Fishbourne and Ryde, and from Lymington to Yarmouth. The other major Solent ferry company, Hovertravel, operates between Southsea and Ryde. Both provide a frequent service to the Isle of Wight, but neither normally serve Southampton, Cowes or East Cowes.

History
The origins of Red Funnel date back to 1820, when the Isle of Wight Royal Mail Steam Packet Company was established by Cowes interests to operate the first steamer service from there to Southampton. In 1826, the Isle of Wight Steam Packet Company was formed in Southampton, and by the following year the two companies had started co-ordinating their operations. In 1860, the Southampton, Isle of Wight & Portsmouth Improved Steamboat Company was created to compete with the two established operators, and the threat posed caused the two older companies to merge. They subsequently acquired the assets of the Improved Steamboat Company in 1865.

Formed in 1861, and called The Southampton Isle of Wight and South of England Royal Mail Steam Packet Company Limited, the merged company's name remains the longest for a registered company in the United Kingdom. The trading name Red Funnel Steamers was adopted in 1935 when all the company's ships had black-topped red funnels, and later shortened to the current Red Funnel. The 1861 name remains the company's formal name.

The company originally operated a paddle steamer ferry service between Cowes, Isle of Wight and Southampton. During its history the company has operated other routes connecting the Isle of Wight and the English mainland, together with a sizable excursion steamer business along the South Coast of England including day trips from the Isle of Wight to France, but today services are concentrated on two routes. In 1931 it introduced its first diesel ferry, the MV Medina. Ferries have steadily increased in size to the current Scottish-built Raptor class operated between East Cowes and Town Quay in Southampton. Between 1969 and the 1990, the company also ran Italian-built hydrofoils between Town Quay and Cowes. This route is now served by high-speed, passenger-only catamarans.

In 1867 Red Funnel instituted a service crossing the River Medina between Cowes and East Cowes. This service was operated by a series of small launches over the years. The service ceased on the outbreak of war in 1939 when the vessels involved were requisitioned by the Admiralty. In 1868 the company took over the Cowes Floating Bridge Company and operated the floating bridge until 1901.

In 1885 the company bought the New Southampton Steam Towing Company and operated tugs and tenders, later under the subsidiary Red Funnel Towage. In 2002 Red Funnel Towage was sold to the Adelaide Steamship Company, later passing to Svitzer Marine.

In 1946 Red Funnel acquired a controlling interest in Cosens & Co Ltd, a rival pleasure steamer operator based in Weymouth. This enabled the combined company to coordinate their excursions and also gave Red Funnel access to the Cosens' marine engineering and ship repair facilities. Excursions came to end in 1966 but the engineering side continued until sold off in 1990 to a management buy-out.

In 2001 the company was sold to JP Morgan Partners by Associated British Ports Holdings, which had acquired the company in 1989 as a white knight to fend off a hostile takeover by Sally Lines. In 2004 the company was sold again in a management buy-out backed by the Bank of Scotland for £60 million. On 12 April 2007, the owners of Red Funnel (who include HBOS) announced that they were considering selling Red Funnel. In June of the same year, the company was sold to the Prudential's infrastructure specialist, Infracapital, in a deal valuing the business at more than £200m.

In 2014, plans came to light for the relocation of Red Funnel's Southampton terminal, as part of the redevelopment of the derelict Royal Pier. The plans would include relocating the vehicle and foot passenger terminals to a new site at Trafalgar Dry Dock, also known as Pier 50. Plans were approved in 2016, and Red Funnel was supposed to relocate at the end of 2017. However, Southampton City Council terminated the deal to relocate the Royal Pier in August 2019, with the impact on the project to relocate the Red Funnel terminals unclear.

In 2017 the company was sold to a consortium, including West Midlands Pension Fund and the Workplace Safety & Insurance Board. In the same year, construction work began on renovating and enlarging the terminal at East Cowes, the first phase of which was completed in August 2018.

In July 2022, Unite members at Red Funnel went on strike over pay, causing the company to have to run a reduced timetable. According to Red Funnel, this was the first strike at the firm since 1966. The strikes were suspended in August 2022 after the company proposed a new pay agreement.

The House Flag

Red Funnel's house flag was adopted in 1861. The design was inspired by the names of the company's early paddle-steamers, Sapphire, Emerald, Ruby and Pearl. A simple rhyme was the guide to flying it correctly:

Current fleet

Vehicle ferries

The first three vessels were built by Ferguson Shipbuilders of Port Glasgow, and entered service between 1994 and 1996. Between 2003 and 2005 the ferries were refitted and extended both in length and height by Remontowa S.A. in Gdańsk, Poland. This was following a corporate decision driven by Tom Docherty to maximise summer operating capacity taking the previous capacity from around 100 CEUs to 213 CEU.

During 2014 Red Falcon underwent a £2.2 million refurbishment, which saw the interior and facilities replaced with a bright and new modern look. Due to success and increase of passengers on their services during 2014, it was confirmed that Red Osprey would also receive a £2.2 million refurbishment. Like her sister ship, the Red Osprey was refitted and relaunched almost exactly a year later. After a delay of three years, the Red Eagle was refitted at the end of 2017.

In February 2018, Red Funnel announced plans to introduce a new freight only ferry into the fleet, to coincide with the refurbishment of their facilities on both sides of the Solent. It was built at the Cammell Laird shipyard in Birkenhead, and was designed to have similar dimensions to Red Funnel's Raptor-class fleet, allowing it to load and unload at the same linkspan used by the other ferries. Construction of the new ferry began on 31 May 2018 with a formal keel laying ceremony. During this event, the ship's name was announced to be Red Kestrel, placing its name in line with those of the rest of Red Funnel's RO-RO ferry fleet. She entered service in May 2019.

Passenger ferries

Red Jet 4 was built new for Red Funnel by North West Bay Ships of Tasmania in 2003. In 2016, Red Funnel took delivery of a new 40-metre high-speed catamaran constructed in East Cowes by Shemara Refit LLP. Named by the Princess Royal on 4 July 2016, Red Jet 6 entered service later in the summer. Red Jet 7 was built by Wight Shipyard in East Cowes. Red Jet 7 was lowered into the River Medina at East Cowes on 6 June 2018, and was christened during a launching ceremony on 24 July 2018.

Former fleet

Classic ferries
Between 1840 and the 1960s, Red Funnel line and its predecessors operated 40 different classic passenger ferries, many of these being paddle steamers. Later ferries sometimes had space allocated for carrying cars but it was not until 1959 that the first purpose-built car ferry was introduced. Classic passenger vessels continued in service until the Balmoral was sold in 1969.

Paddle steamers

Twin-screw steamers

Motor vessels

{| class="wikitable"
!width=115px|Ship
!width=75px|Service
!Notes
|-
| (III)
|1931–1962
|The first diesel engined ferry on the Solent
|-
| (I)
|1938–1965
|2 × English Electric 6LM type diesels.  Sold to P & A Campbell, renamed Westward Ho'
|-
| (II)
|1949–1969
| Operated by P & A Campbell from 1968 to 1980. In 1981 she was sold for use as a floating nightclub in Dundee. Bought in 1985 by Waverley Excursions, she acted as the sister ship of the Waverley until 2012. Entered service on 19 June 2015 with White Funnel Ltd.
|}

Car ferries

Although some earlier ferries provided space for cars, Red Funnel introduced its first purpose-built car ferry in 1959. Besides the Raptor-class vessels that are still in service, the following car ferries have been used by Red Funnel:

Fast passenger ferries
The first fast ferry introduced by Red Funnel was the Sea Coach Island Enterprise, a motor cruiser capable of carrying 11 passengers at 20 knots. She was built by the British Power Boat Company in Hythe, and operated from 1933 to 1938.

Hovercraft

In 1968 the company ran trials with an HM2 sidewall hovercraft, number 002, in order to compete with the Seaspeed service which used an SRN6 between Southampton and Cowes. Due to the unreliability of the craft it never entered passenger service. In 1981 Red Funnel acquired a pair of HM2 MkIIIs, GH2019 & GH2024, which were primarily used on the charter service for Vosper Thorneycroft transporting workers from the Isle of Wight to the Woolston yard and back each day. These two craft were disposed of in June 1982 and the charter subsequently operated by the augmented hydrofoil fleet.

Hydrofoils

The first hydrofoils to operate on the Southampton to Cowes route, and the first in commercial service in the United Kingdom, were the Italian designed Shearwater and Shearwater 2. These were introduced by Red Funnel in 1969, and each seated 54 passengers. They were replaced in 1973 by two 67-seat RH70 hydrofoils, built by Cantière Navale Rodriguez, named Shearwater 3 and Shearwater 4. The latter was delivered some five months after the former and in the interim a PT20 craft, Fleccia di Reggio, was chartered to stand in. In 1982 Shearwater 5 and Shearwater 6 were added to the fleet. In 1991, with the introduction of the first Red Jet catamarans, the hydrofoils were demoted to back-up duties until they were finally withdrawn in 1998.

Red Jets

Tugs and tug tenders

Some tugs also had passenger accommodation to enable them to serve as tenders to liners not actually berthing in Southampton and to augment the excursion fleet on occasion.

Medina crossing

Incidents
On 9 March 1997 Red Falcon, inbound from Cowes, collided in Southampton Water with the outbound trailing suction hopper dredger Volvox Hansa in fog. Both ships' masters were held to blame.

On 10 March 2006 the car ferry Red Falcon, collided with the linkspan at the Southampton Town Quay terminal. Eight passengers and one crew member were injured and significant damage was caused to the Southampton end of the Red Falcon and to the linkspan. The collision caused a  hole above the waterline and buckling of the car deck doors. Red Eagle collided with Humber Energy in the Thorne Channel, near Southampton Water, on the evening of 21 December 2006. Coastguards said nobody was injured and neither vessel was badly damaged. Richard Pellew, of the Maritime and Coastguard Agency, said: "Having examined the minor damage sustained to the Red Eagle we are advising Red Funnel on the repair work the ferry needs before it can resume normal service."

On 5 November 2016 a man on a personal water craft collided with Red Jet 4. No one was injured and no damage was caused.
 Red Eagle was involved in a collision in thick fog on 27 September 2018. It was reported that the ferry had ploughed through the moorings of three yachts and a channel marker was struck. The following month, the Red Falcon also hit several yachts at East Cowes in thick fog, sinking one of them. The vessel grounded in the incident with forty passengers aboard and was not refloated until three hours later. The sunken yacht, Greylag'', was recovered the following day.

References

External links 

 
 
  The Articles of Association of the 1861 company

Companies based in Southampton
Ferry companies of England
Ferry transport on the Isle of Wight
Shipping companies of the United Kingdom
1861 establishments in England